Satellite High School is a public high school (grades 9 - 12) located in Satellite Beach, Florida in Florida's Space Coast, Brevard County. It was founded in 1962, and has been rated an 'A' school in the state of Florida since 2003 . The mascot is the Scorpion.

Academics 
The school has 92 teachers, 12 support personnel, six administrators, and four guidance counselors.

State school grades and demographics
2007 Overall Grade: A 
 Stability rate (% of students in attendance 1st semester who are present 2nd semester): 93.54%
 Graduation rate: 96.41%
 SAT scores average: Mathematics (Year 2006) 544, Reading (Year 2006) 526
 ACT average: (Year 2006) 21.8
 Gifted Students: 14.28%
 Race Distribution: 91% White, 4% Hispanic, 3% Asian, 2% Black

Campus 

In 2009, a $35 million upgrade was completed.

Fine Arts

Fine Arts Academy 
Satellite High School is one of three high schools in Brevard County to have a Fine Arts Academy. The Fine Arts Academy is a Career Academy that integrates arts education into the core academic curriculum. Fine arts areas of concentration include Digital Media, Fashion Design, Instrumental Music, Technical Design, Theatre, Visual Arts, and Vocal Music.

Athletics 
Satellite is part of the Florida High School Athletic Association and competes in the Cape Coast Conference located in Brevard County, Florida.

Satellite has captured 17 state championships in six sports in its 46-year history. The girls have won 13 state championships in its history.

State Championships 
 Softball - 1982 & 1990 
 Baseball - 1986 
 Men's Swimming - 1996 Class 5A championship, 1999 Class 3A championship, & 2005 Class 2A championship 
 Men's Cross Country - 2019 Class 2A championship, 2020 Class 2A championship
 Girls' Swimming - 2004 Class 2A championship, 2005 Class 2A championship, 2006 Class 2A championship, 2007 Class 2A runner-up 
 Girls' Cross Country - 2005 Class 3A championship, 2006 Class 3A championship, 2007 Class 3A championship 
 Girls' Soccer - 2002 Class 3A championship (29-1-1, Finished No. 5 in nation), 2003 Class 3A championship (27-2-0), 2007 Class 5A championship. Reached Final Four from 1995–1998, 2002–2005, & 2007-2009.

Notable alumni 

 Mark Baldwin - 1970.  Game designer and developer.
 Ramsey Denison - 1997. Documentary filmmaker, editor
 Ashlyn Harris - 2004. Four-Time Parade Magazine All-American goalkeeper for the University of North Carolina women's soccer team.  Three-time NCAA Champion. Two-time FIFA Women's World Cup champion. 
 Catharina Haynes - 1980. A federal judge on the United States Court of Appeals for the Fifth Circuit.
 C. J. Hobgood - 1997. Twin brother of Damien Hobgood,  Professional surfer.
 Damien Hobgood - 1997. Twin brother of C.J. Hobgood, Professional surfer.
 Kelly Kretschman - 1997. Softball record holder
 Britt McHenry - 2004 ESPN Sports Reporter
 J. Keith Moyer - 1970. President, CEO and Publisher of the Minneapolis Star Tribune, senior fellow in journalism at University of Minnesota
 Gary Pruitt - 1975 President and CEO of The Associated Press.
 Matt Skrmetta - 1990. Major League Baseball pitcher
 Leonard Weaver - 2001. all-pro fullback for the Seattle Seahawks & Philadelphia Eagles (2006–2010)

References 

High schools in Brevard County, Florida
Educational institutions established in 1962
Satellite Beach, Florida
Public high schools in Florida
1962 establishments in Florida